The Fort Gaines Historic District in Fort Gaines, Georgia is a  historic district which was listed on the National Register of Historic Places in 1984.

It is roughly bounded by the Chattahoochee River, GA 37, GA 39, College, Commerce and Jefferson Streets.

It includes Greek Revival, Gothic Revival, Neo-Classical Revival architecture.

It includes the Clay County Courthouse.

It included 327 contributing buildings.

The NRHP nomination stated:Fort Gaines is a good intact example of a frontier Georgia town planned and developed in the nineteenth century for a combination of military, political, and commercial purposes. It is historically significant in the areas of exploration and settlement, military history, community planning and development, architecture, landscape architecture, commerce, industry, transportation, politics and government, and historic archaeology.

References

Historic districts on the National Register of Historic Places in Georgia (U.S. state)
Greek Revival architecture in Georgia (U.S. state)
Gothic Revival architecture in Georgia (U.S. state)
Neoclassical architecture in Georgia (U.S. state)
Buildings and structures completed in 1930
National Register of Historic Places in Clay County, Georgia